Claudiu Gabriel Marin  (born 23 August 1972) is a retired Romanian rower. He competed at the 1992, 1996 and 2000 Olympics and won a silver medal in the eights in 1992. At the world championships he won a gold, a silver and a bronze medal in 1996–1997.

References

External links
 

1972 births
Living people
People from Munteni
Romanian male rowers
Rowers at the 1992 Summer Olympics
Rowers at the 1996 Summer Olympics
Olympic silver medalists for Romania
Olympic rowers of Romania
Olympic medalists in rowing
World Rowing Championships medalists for Romania
Medalists at the 1992 Summer Olympics
20th-century Romanian people